Tin (also Romanized as Tīn) is a village in Makvan Rural District, Bayangan District, Paveh County, Kermanshah Province, Iran. At the 2006 census, its population was 447, in 120 families.

References 

Populated places in Paveh County